The Little Molasses River is an  river in Gladwin County, Michigan, in the United States. It is a tributary of the Molasses River, which flows to the Tittabawassee River and is part of the Saginaw River watershed.

See also
List of rivers of Michigan

References

Michigan  Streamflow Data from the USGS

Rivers of Michigan
Rivers of Gladwin County, Michigan
Tributaries of Lake Huron